Testudinalia testudinalis, common name the common tortoise limpet, is a species of sea snail, a true limpet, a marine gastropod mollusk in the family Lottiidae, one of the families of true limpets. It is commonly known as the plant limpet or tortoiseshell limpet.

Description
T. testudinalis has a low domed shell, oval in outline. It can grow to up to 30 x 24 x 10 mm but typically is about half this size. The apex is towards the anterior of the shell and fine ridges radiate from it. The shell is banded with brown and white. The mantle is the part of the body wall immediately under the shell and at the edges it is curled round to form a collar. The foot is broad and oval. The head bears two sensory tentacles with a tiny black eye at the base of each.

Distribution and habitat
T. testudinalis occurs in northern regions of both the Pacific and Northwest Atlantic Oceans and in European waters. It is found in the neritic zone from low water mark down to a depth of about fifty metres. It is usually found on stones and boulders, especially those encrusted with red crustose algae such as Lithothamnion.

Biology
Red eggs are laid in a sheet in the spring and the larvae are planktonic.

References

 Ziegelmeier, E. (1966). Die Schnecken (Gastropoda Prosobranchia) der deutsche Meeresgebiete und brackigen Küstengewässer [The Gastropoda Prosobranchia from the German seas and brackish coastal waters]. Helgol. Wiss. Meeresunters. 13: 1-66
 Hayward, P.J.; Ryland, J.S. (Ed.) (1990). The marine fauna of the British Isles and North-West Europe: 1. Introduction and protozoans to arthropods. Clarendon Press: Oxford, UK. . 627 pp.
 Brunel, P., L. Bosse, & G. Lamarche. (1998). Catalogue of the marine invertebrates of the estuary and Gulf of St. Lawrence. Canadian Special Publication of Fisheries and Aquatic Sciences, 126. 405 p. 
 Turgeon, D.D., et al. 1998. Common and scientific names of aquatic invertebrates of the United States and Canada. American Fisheries Society Special Publication 26 page(s): 56
 de Kluijver, M.J.; Ingalsuo, S.S.; de Bruyne, R.H. (2000). Macrobenthos of the North Sea [CD-ROM]: 1. Keys to Mollusca and Brachiopoda. World Biodiversity Database CD-ROM Series. Expert Center for Taxonomic Identification (ETI): Amsterdam, The Netherlands. . 1 cd-rom pp.
 Gofas, S.; Le Renard, J.; Bouchet, P. (2001). Mollusca, in: Costello, M.J. et al. (Ed.) (2001). European register of marine species: a check-list of the marine species in Europe and a bibliography of guides to their identification. Collection Patrimoines Naturels, 50: pp. 180–213
 Trott, T.J. 2004. Cobscook Bay inventory: a historical checklist of marine invertebrates spanning 162 years. Northeastern Naturalist (Special Issue 2): 261 - 324. 
 Kantor Yu.I. & Sysoev A.V. (2006) Marine and brackish water Gastropoda of Russia and adjacent countries: an illustrated catalogue. Moscow: KMK Scientific Press. 372 pp. + 140 pls. page(s): 22
 Nakano & Ozawa (2007). Worldwide phylogeography of limpets of the order Patellogastropoda: Molecular, morphological and palaeontological evidence. Journal of Molluscan Studies 73(1) 79-99.

Lottiidae
Gastropods described in 1776
Taxa named by Otto Friedrich Müller